The Battle of Palembang was a naval battle fought in 1407 between Ming China's treasure fleet commanded by Admiral Zheng He and the pirate fleet of Chen Zuyi at Palembang, Sumatra, in what is now modern Indonesia. The battle resulted in the defeat of Chen Zuyi, who was captured and sent to China for execution.

Background 
Chen Zuyi was a pirate leader who had seized Palembang on Sumatra. He dominated the maritime route of the Straits of Malacca. The chronicler Ma Huan wrote that Shi Jinqing was the person who had informed Admiral Zheng He about Chen Zuyi's depredations. The Haiquo Quangji by Shen Moushang states that, when Chen Zuyi was planning to attack Zheng He, Shi Jinqing secretly reported Chen's plans to Zheng He.

Course 
In 1407, while returning homewards during the first Ming treasure voyage, Zheng He and his associates engaged Chen Zuyi and his pirate fleet in battle at Palembang. The Chinese treasure fleet defeated Chen's pirate fleet in this encounter. During the confrontation, 5,000 pirates were killed, ten pirate ships were destroyed, and seven pirate ships were captured.

The Mingshi records that Zheng He was initially sent to Palembang to negotiate the pacification of Chen Zuyi and others, but it also states that Chen and the others plotted to attack the Ming forces. The Taizong Shilu records that Chen Zuyi tried to evade and withdraw from active engagement with the treasure fleet. Dreyer (2007) characterizes the much-later account of Chen Zuyi in the Mingshi as a disparaging attempt to portray him as an evil pirate and thereby contrast him from the Chinese merchants of Palembang who submitted.

The fleet took three prisoners, including Chen Zuyi, back to the Chinese capital Nanjing for decapitation.

Aftermath 
On 2 October 1407, Chen Zuyi and his lieutenants were executed. On 29 October 1407, the Yongle Emperor of Ming issued an order to reward the officers and other crew members who went to battle against Chen Zuyi's pirate fleet at Palembang. 

The Ming court appointed Shi Jinqing as the Pacification Superintendent of Palembang, thereby establishing an ally at Palembang and securing access to this important port.

See also
 Ming–Kotte War

References

Citations

Sources 

 
 
 
 
 

Treasure voyages
Palembang
Palembang
1407 in Asia
Palembang
15th century in Indonesia
15th century in China
History of Sumatra
Palembang
Palembang